Ebensburg Airport  is a public airport located approximately  southwest of Ebensburg, Pennsylvania.  It provides general aviation service.

See also

 Pennsylvania World War II Army Airfields

References

 Shaw, Frederick J. (2004), Locating Air Force Base Sites History's Legacy, Air Force History and Museums Program, United States Air Force, Washington DC, 2004.

External links
 

Airfields of the United States Army Air Forces Technical Service Command
Airfields of the United States Army Air Forces in Pennsylvania
Airports in Pennsylvania
Transportation buildings and structures in Cambria County, Pennsylvania